Parting Ways or Partin' Ways may refer to:

 Parting Ways (Plymouth, Massachusetts)
 Parting Ways: Jewishness and the Critique of Zionism, a 2012 book by Judith Butler
 "Parting Ways", a song by Pearl Jam from Binaural
 "Partin' Ways", a song by Polo G from Hall of Fame 2.0